Roger Heinkelé (6 January 1913 – 24 April 2001) was a French diver. He competed at the 1936 Summer Olympics and the 1948 Summer Olympics.

References

1913 births
2001 deaths
French male divers
Olympic divers of France
Divers at the 1936 Summer Olympics
Divers at the 1948 Summer Olympics
Place of birth missing
20th-century French people